Ahmed Aloulou (born 15 July 1996) is a Tunisian professional footballer, who is currently playing for riverside west end , as a forward. Aloulou has previously played for Alloa Athletic and Berwick Rangers on loan.

Early and personal life
Ahmed was born in Sfax. His father was an engineer, and the family moved around, including spending 8 years in Aberdeen (where Ahmed began playing football) before moving to Romania in 2010. He studied for a mechanical engineering degree at Dundee University.

Futsal career
Ahmed played club futsal for Dundee Futsal whilst attending university.

He represented Scotland at international futsal, earning 5 caps.

Football career
After graduating from university in the summer of 2018, Ahmed trialled for Alloa Athletic before being offered a contract. He made his debut for Alloa on 8 September 2018, becoming "the first player to graduate from Scotland's futsal set-up to 11-a-side senior football". In January 2019 he moved on loan to Berwick Rangers taking the number 10 shirt. He made his debut for Berwick on 9 February in Scottish league 2 against Stirling Albion which ended in a 2–1 loss. Ahmed made 9 appearances during his time at  Berwick Rangers, all occurring in Scottish League Two as Berwick Rangers finished bottom of the table. Berwick Rangers F.C. went on to lose 7–0 on aggregate to Cove Rangers in the playoffs which led to them being relegated to the Lowland League. On 1 July 2019, Ahmed was released by Alloa Athletic F.C. On 20 December 2019, Aloulou signed for Stenhousemuir F.C. but was released in July 2020 without making a single appearance.

Playing style
Ahmed has been described by Alloa Athletic as "technically very good, has decent pace and is good at linking the game up".

Career statistics

References

1996 births
Living people
Scottish men's futsal players
Tunisian footballers
Alloa Athletic F.C. players
Berwick Rangers F.C. players
Association football forwards
Scottish Professional Football League players
Tunisian expatriate footballers
Expatriate footballers in Scotland
Tunisian expatriate sportspeople in Scotland
Alumni of the University of Dundee